Dark is the Night (Тёмная ночь, lit. Dark Night) is a famous Soviet song associated with the Great Patriotic War. It was originally performed by Mark Bernes in the 1943 war film Two Soldiers.

The song was composed by Nikita Bogoslovsky (1913-2004), lyrics by Vladimir Agatov specially for the film Two Soldiers. Leonid Utyosov, without knowledge and without permission of authors and film unit, recorded the song, thus becoming the first to do so, but it was Bernes' performance that made it so popular. In the film, Bernes is a soldier who recalls his wife and baby at night while singing the song.

The official experts were keen to accuse Bogoslovsky of propagating "Philistine" sentimental tunes. Though ostracized by the authorities, the song became a symbol of the war years for millions of Soviet people.

Dark Is the Night has been described as "a gentle lyrical song imbued with a feeling of homesickness and expressing devotion to one's beloved" which helped "reveal the personal side of army life, indiscernable in the roar of warfare". It contrasted sharply with the prevalent type of war song, which was either a field marching song or a civil patriotic one.

Translated versions 

Hebrew: לילה אפל
Estonian: Pimedal ööl
Finnish: Tumma yö (at least with two different lyrics made by Antero Byman and Timo Vuori)
Serbo-Croatian: Tamna je noć
Polish: Ciemna dziś noc

Other performances 
Apart from Bernes and Utyosov, the song was performed by Ivan Kozlovsky, Muslim Magomayev, Lyudmila Gurchenko, Jason Kouchak, Noize MC, Zemfira, Ivan Rebroff, Georg Malmstén, Basta, and Alexander Goldscheider among many others.

In translated versions it was popularized by Wiera Gran and Farhad among many others.

Film 
The song was later popularized in other films:

In 1958 it has been used as a trademark tune of the World War II period in such films as Andrzej Wajda's Ashes and Diamonds.

In 2005, the song became a main motif and title of the Israeli film "Dark Night" by Leonid Prudovsky. The film gathered numerous prizes including special mention, best short film at 62nd Venice International Film Festival (2005) and Silver Warsaw Phoenix in short film category at 4th Jewish Motifs International Film Festival (2007) in Warsaw, Poland.

In 2006, the song was used as the main theme in the Swedish horror film Frostbite, foreshadowing the coming of vampires in a northern Swedish town.

References 

Songs about nights
Soviet songs
Russian songs
Songs written for films
1943 songs